The 1954 season was the 24th completed season of Finnish Football League Championship, known as the Mestaruussarja.

Overview
The Mestaruussarja was administered by the Finnish Football Association and the competition's 1954 season was contested by 10 teams. Pyrkivä Turku won the championship and the two lowest placed teams of the competition, Jäntevä Kotka and KPT Kuopio, were relegated to the Suomensarja.

League standings

Results

Footnotes

References
Finland - List of final tables (RSSSF)

Mestaruussarja seasons
Fin
Fin
1